Dadrewa is a village situated in Churu district of Rajasthan, India. The village is situated on the Hissar-Bikaner Highway in between Sadulpur and Taranagar. The famous Gogaji maharaj, was born at Dadrewa.

References

Villages in Churu district